Svetlana Grinberg (married name Fedorova), is a former female international table tennis player from Soviet Union.

Table tennis career
From 1967 to 1970 she won several medals in singles, doubles, and team events in the Table Tennis European Championships and in the World Table Tennis Championships.

Her four World Championship medals included two gold medals in the doubles with Zoja Rudnova and the team event at the 1969 World Table Tennis Championships.

She also won two English Open titles.

See also
 List of table tennis players
 List of World Table Tennis Championships medalists

References

Soviet table tennis players
Russian female table tennis players
Place of birth missing (living people)
1944 births
Living people